Kjell Gimre (born 8 October 1946) is a former speedway rider from Norway.

Speedway career 
Gimre is a former champion of Norway, winning the Norwegian Championship in 1978. 

He rode in the top tier of British Speedway from 1971 until 1973, riding for various clubs.

References 

1946 births
Living people
Norwegian speedway riders
Exeter Falcons riders
Glasgow Tigers riders
Norwegian expatriate sportspeople in England